Scrobipalpa feralella is a moth in the family Gelechiidae. It was described by Zeller in 1872. It is found in Austria, Switzerland and northern Italy.

The forewings are dark brown. The hindwings are lighter and lightly glossy.

References

Scrobipalpa
Moths described in 1872